The Division of Griffith is an electoral division for the Australian House of Representatives. The division covers the inner southern suburbs of Brisbane, Queensland.

History

The division is named after Sir Samuel Griffith, former politician and a principal author of the Constitution of Australia.

Griffith was created in 1934, replacing the seat of Oxley which had been established in 1900.

Terri Butler retained the seat for Labor at the 2014 Griffith by-election on 8 February, caused by the resignation of the previous member, former Prime Minister Kevin Rudd, who held the seat from 1998 until his resignation in November 2013.

Griffith has a growing Greens vote, with the party winning 5 booths on primary vote at the 2019 federal election and a further 4 booths in which the party came at a close second. The Greens also achieved their strongest favourable swing in 2019 within this seat (at 6.67%). In 2020, the Greens  won the state seat of South Brisbane from Labor, which overlaps with part of the electorate, further supporting the trend of a growing Greens vote that has reduced Labor's primary vote in the seat. This subsequently led to Greens candidate Max Chandler-Mather winning the seat in the 2022 federal election, with 60.5% of the two-party preferred vote and 34.6% of the first preference vote.

Boundaries
Since 1984, federal electoral division boundaries in Australia have been determined at redistributions by a redistribution committee appointed by the Australian Electoral Commission. Redistributions occur for the boundaries of divisions in a particular state, and they occur every seven years, or sooner if a state's representation entitlement changes or when divisions of a state are malapportioned.

Griffith covers the inner southern Brisbane suburbs of Balmoral, Bulimba, Camp Hill, Carina Heights, Coorparoo, Dutton Park, East Brisbane, Greenslopes, Highgate Hill, Hawthorne, Kangaroo Point, Morningside, Norman Park, Seven Hills, South Brisbane, Stones Corner, West End and Woolloongabba, as well as parts of Annerley, Cannon Hill, Carina, Holland Park, Holland Park West, Mount Gravatt East, Murarrie, and Tarragindi.

Members

Election results

References

External links
 Division of Griffith (Qld) — Australian Electoral Commission

Electoral divisions of Australia
Constituencies established in 1934
1934 establishments in Australia
Federal politics in Queensland